United States ex rel. Gerald Mayo v. Satan and His Staff, 54 F.R.D. 282 (W.D.Pa. 1971), was a federal court case in which a prisoner filed a lawsuit  in United States District Court against Satan and his servants. The case's class-action status was dismissed on procedural grounds.

Complaint
Gerald Mayo, a 22-year-old inmate at Western Penitentiary in Pittsburgh, Pennsylvania, filed a claim before the United States District Court for the Western District of Pennsylvania in which he alleged that "Satan has on numerous occasions caused plaintiff misery and unwarranted threats, against the will of plaintiff, that Satan has placed deliberate obstacles in his path and has caused plaintiff's downfall" and had therefore "deprived him of his constitutional rights" in violation of the United States Code. Mayo filed in forma pauperis, that is, he asserted that he would not be able to afford the costs associated with his lawsuit and that therefore they should be waived. Mayo decided to file suit lawsuit against Satan and his minions, which was an external force over which the prison had no control.

Decision
In his decision, U.S. District Court Judge Gerald J. Weber first noted that the jurisdictional situation was unclear. While no previous cases had been brought by or against Satan and no official precedent existed, Weber jokingly remarked that there was an "unofficial account of a trial in New Hampshire where this defendant filed an action of mortgage foreclosure as plaintiff," a reference to the 1936 short story "The Devil and Daniel Webster" by Stephen Vincent Benét. Weber suggested that the Devil, who had claimed in that story to be an American, should he have appeared, might have been therefore stopped from arguing a lack of personal jurisdiction. In this context, the court noted that Satan was a foreign prince, but did not have occasion to address whether, if sued as a defendant, he would be able to claim sovereign immunity from suit.

Weber noted that three of the four requirements for a class action suit were met, but he was unable to determine whether Mayo would adequately represent the class and therefore the case could not continue.

Finally, the judge noted that Mayo had failed to provide directions to the United States Marshals Service as to service of process.

Citing the foregoing reasons, the court refused the request to proceed in forma pauperis. The court doubted the need for action due to the complaint containing no allegation of residence in plaintiff.

Precedent created 
This case is used to teach law students the requirements necessary for the service of process. The textbook Civil Procedure Cases, Materials, and Questions 8th Edition by Freer et al. cites it in the third chapter, stating "When the marshal's office does serve process, the plaintiff may be required to instruct the marshal on how to do so. In Mayo v. Satan & his staff, 54 F.R.D. 282 (W.D. Pa. 1971), the court dismissed the case because the plaintiff failed to render such aid when asking the marshal to serve the devil himself."

See also
Lawsuits against the Devil

References

External links
 

 Mayo v. Satan
Mayo v. Satan
 Mayo v. Satan
Lawsuits against the Devil